Jovo Lukić (born 28 November 1998) is a Bosnian professional footballer who plays as a forward for Bosnian Premier League club Borac Banja Luka and the Bosnia and Herzegovina national team.

He started his professional career at Sloga Doboj, before joining Krupa in 2018. In 2019, Lukić was loaned to Zvijezda Gradačac. The following year, he signed with Borac Banja Luka.

A former youth international for Bosnia and Herzegovina, Lukić made his senior international debut in 2021.

Club career

Early career
Lukić started playing football at Modriča, before joining youth setup of his hometown club Sloga Doboj. He made his professional debut against Sutjeska Foča on 6 August 2016 at the age of 17. On 19 November, he scored his first professional goal in a triumph over Kozara Gradiška. Lukić scored his first career hat-trick against Borac Šamac on 10 June 2017.

In February 2018, he moved to Krupa. In February 2019, he was loaned to Zvijezda Gradačac until the end of season.

On 20 June 2020, Lukić signed with Borac Banja Luka. He debuted for Borac in a league game against Mladost Doboj Kakanj on 1 August 2020.

International career
Lukić was a member of Bosnia and Herzegovina under-21 team under coach Vinko Marinović.

Personal life
Lukić's father Mitar was also a professional footballer.

Lukić married his long-time girlfriend Zorana. Together they have a son.

Career statistics

Club

International

Honours
Krupa
First League of RS: 2019–20

Borac Banja Luka
Bosnian Premier League: 2020–21

Individual
Performance
First League of RS top goalscorer: 2019–20 (12 goals)

References

External links

1998 births
Living people
People from Doboj
Serbs of Bosnia and Herzegovina
Bosnia and Herzegovina footballers
Bosnia and Herzegovina under-21 international footballers
Association football forwards
FK Sloga Doboj players
FK Krupa players
NK Zvijezda Gradačac players
FK Borac Banja Luka players
First League of the Republika Srpska players
Premier League of Bosnia and Herzegovina players
First League of the Federation of Bosnia and Herzegovina players